The Triple Crown or the Grand Slam are terms used in the entertainment industry to describe individuals who have won the three highest accolades recognised in British film, television, and theatre: a British Academy Film Award, a British Academy Television Award, and a Laurence Olivier Award respectively.

Triple Crown winners

Additional recipients (including non-competitive awards)

Two competitive awards
The following individuals have each won two out of the three major awards in competitive categories:

Missing a BAFTA Film Award

 Eileen Atkins◊
 Rowan Atkinson
 Simon Russell Beale
 David Bradley
 Cheryl Campbell
 Michaela Coel
 Benedict Cumberbatch◊
 Monica Dolan
 Michael Gambon
 Derek Jacobi◊
 Toby Jones
 Penelope Keith◊
 Warren Mitchell†
 John Napier
 Vanessa Redgrave◊ NCA
 Beryl Reid†
 Andrew Scott
 Fiona Shaw
 Sheridan Smith
 Margaret Tyzack†
 Gwen Watford†

Missing a BAFTA Television Award

 Jenny Beavan◊
 Dora Bryan†
 Pauline Collins
 Chiwetel Ejiofor
 John Gielgud†
 John Hodge
 Ian Holm◊ †
 Ayub Khan Din
 Martin McDonagh
 Anthony Minghella†
 Sam Mendes◊
 Eddie Redmayne
 Kristin Scott Thomas
 Imelda Staunton◊
 Rachel Weisz

Missing a Laurence Olivier Award

 Robert Altman†
 Jim Broadbent
 Peter Capaldi
 Olivia Colman
 Steve Coogan
 Tom Courtenay
 Denholm Elliott†
 Hildur Guðnadóttir
 Alec Guinness◊ †
 Anthony Hopkins◊ NCA
 John Hurt†
 Glenda Jackson◊
 Celia Johnson†
 Jeremy Kleiner
 Ray McAnally◊
 Adam McKay
 Peter Morgan◊
 Bill Nighy
 Emma Thompson
 Tracey Ullman
 Billie Whitelaw†

Notes
 † – Person is deceased.
 ◊ – Person has been nominated at least once for a competitive category of the missing award, but has failed to win.
 NCA – Person won a Non-Competitive Award in this category.

Three nominations
The following individuals have not won all three awards in competitive categories, but have received at least one nomination for each of them:

 Eileen Atkins
 Jenny Beavan
 Benedict Cumberbatch
 Stephen Daldry
 Anne-Marie DuffN/A
 Andrew Garfield
 Alec Guinness†
 Ian Holm†
 Anthony Hopkins
 Rupert EverettN/A
 Glenda Jackson
 Derek Jacobi
 Penelope Keith
 Nicole Kidman
 Rosemary Leach†
 Robert Lindsay
 Lesley Manville
 Ian McKellen
 Alfred MolinaN/A
 Peter Morgan
 Sam Mendes
 Paul Mescal
 Vanessa Redgrave
 Lesley SharpN/A
 Michael SheenN/A
 Maggie Smith
 Imelda Staunton
 Juliet Stevenson
 Dorothy Tutin†
 Zoë Wanamaker
 Emily Watson
 Ben Whishaw

Notes
 † – Person is deceased.
 N/A – Person has not won any of the three awards (excluding non-competitive awards).

See also
 Triple Crown of Acting (U.S.)

Notes

References